Lucas Hnath is an American playwright. He won the 2016 Obie Award for excellence in playwriting for his plays Red Speedo and The Christians. He also won a Whiting Award.

Biography
Hnath grew up in Orlando, Florida. He moved to New York City in 1997 to study pre-med, and then changed to dramatic writing at the Tisch School of the Arts, at New York University, earning a BFA in 2001, and an MFA in 2002. He teaches at New York University.

He is a resident playwright at New Dramatists.

Red Speedo premiered Off-Broadway at the New York Theatre Workshop from February 17, 2016 to March 27, 2016. The play, directed by Lileana Blain-Cruz, won the Obie Award, Playwriting and Performance for Lucas Caleb Rooney. The play involves Ray, a competitive swimmer at the start of the trials for the Olympic team. Jesse Green, in his review for Vulture, wrote: "Hnath is never interested solely in the material repercussions of character... In Red Speedo, the underlying subject seems to be the cost of morality, which is generally too high for people like Ray... Hnath lightly suggests — he's too subtle to use the big hammer — that the immoral imbalance of our current economy is stripping us down to our animal skins. All we're good for is competition." The play opened at the Studio Theatre, Washington, DC, in 2013. The director of the production, Lila Neugebauer, explained: "...doping is just the arena for a conversation about what constitutes fairness, and the myth of equal opportunity."

His play A Doll's House, Part 2 premiered on Broadway at the John Golden Theatre on April 1, 2017 in previews and closed on September 24, 2017. Directed by Sam Gold, the cast featured Laurie Metcalf, Chris Cooper, Jayne Houdyshell, and Condola Rashād. The play was commissioned by South Coast Repertory, Costa Mesa, California, where it was running at the same time, directed by Shelley Butler, beginning April 9, 2017. This marked Hnath's Broadway debut. Hnath's play "picks up after Henrik Ibsen's A Doll's House concludes." The play was nominated for the 2017 Tony Award for Best Play and Laurie Metcalf won the 2017 Tony Award for Best Performance by an Actress in a Leading Role in a Play.

His play Hillary and Clinton opened in previews on Broadway at the John Golden Theatre on March 16, 2019, officially on April 18. The play was directed by Joe Mantello and stars Laurie Metcalf and John Lithgow. The play had pre-Broadway engagements starting in 2016 at the Victory Gardens Theater, Chicago.

Dana H. premiered at the Kirk Douglas Theatre (Los Angeles) on May 26, 2019 in previews, officially on June 2, presented by the Center Theatre Group. The play relates a real-life incident in the life of his mother, Dana Higginbotham. The play is directed by Les Waters and stars Deirdre O'Connell. The play was commissioned by The Civilians (New York) and the Goodman Theatre (Chicago), played at the Goodman later in 2019, and premiered on Broadway in 2021.

The Christians 
His play The Christians concerns influence and faith in a megachurch, with much of the cast being a church "spirit-raising choir". The plot concerns a pastor who discards traditional fundamentalist Christianity in favor of a more inclusive and universalist Christianity, which affirms the goodness in other religions, and the impact this has on his congregation.

It was produced at the Humana Festival of New American Plays (Louisville, Kentucky) in 2014 and premiered Off-Broadway at Playwrights Horizons on August 28, 2015 (previews), closing on October 25, 2015. Directed by Les Waters, the cast featured Andrew Garman as "Pastor Paul", Larry Powell as "Associate Pastor Joshua", Linda Powell as "Elizabeth", Phillip Kerr as "Elder Jay", and Emily Donahoe as "The Congregant". The play made its  Chicago premiere at Steppenwolf Theatre Company on December 1, 2016, directed by K. Todd Freeman. The  Chicago Sun-Times reviewer called it a "thought-provoking play". Subsequently, it premiered in the  San Francisco Bay Area at San Francisco Playhouse on January 24, 2017, directed by Bill English.<ref>Hurwitt, Sam. [http://www.mercurynews.com/2017/02/03/review-the-christians-in-san-francisco-grapples-with-issues-of-faith-loyalty/ "Review: ‘The Christians’ in San Francisco grapples with issues of faith, loyalty] The Mercury News, 2017</ref>

The play was nominated for two 2016 Drama Desk Awards: Outstanding Play and Outstanding Actor in a Play, Andrew Garman. The play was nominated for the 2016 Lortel Awards for Outstanding Play and Outstanding Lead Actor in a Play (Garman). The play won the 2016 Outer Critics Circle Award, Outstanding New Off-Broadway Play.

Works
 Death Tax, 2012, Humana Festival of New American Plays; Royal Court Theatre
 A Public Reading of an Unproduced Screenplay About the Death of Walt Disney, 2013, Soho RepIsaac's Eye, New York City, Ensemble Studio TheatreRed Speedo, Overlook Press, ; 2013, Studio Theater, Washington, DC; 2016, New York Theatre WorkshopThe Christians, Overlook Press, 2015, Actors Theatre of Louisville; Playwright's Horizons 
 Hillary and Clinton, 2016, Victory Gardens Theater, Chicago; 2019, John Golden Theatre, Broadway
 A Doll's House, Part 2, 2017, John Golden Theatre, Broadway
 Dana H., 2019, Kirk Douglas Theatre, Los Angeles; 2021, Lyceum Theatre, Broadway
 The Thin Place, 2019, Playwrights Horizons
 The Courtship of Anna Nicole Smith (audio short play), 2020, Playing on Air

Awards and honors
 2018 Windham–Campbell Literature Prize in Drama
 2017 Steinberg Playwright Award ("Mimi" Award), with a $50,000 monetary award
 2015 Whiting Award
 2016 Obie Award for Playwriting for The Christians 2016 Joseph Kesselring Prize for The Christians 2015 Guggenheim Fellowship
 2012 Whitfield Cook Award for Isaacs Eye Two Steinberg/ATCA New Play Award Citations (2013 for Death Tax'')

References

External links
 Internet Off-Broadway Database

American male dramatists and playwrights
Living people
Writers from Orlando, Florida
New York University faculty
21st-century American dramatists and playwrights
21st-century American male writers
Tisch School of the Arts alumni
Year of birth missing (living people)